The Sarangani Reconciliation and Reformation Organization (SARRO) is a Sarangani regional political party in the Philippines, closely affiliated with the Lakas-Christian and Muslim Democrats.

There are no results available of the last elections for the House of Representatives, but according to the website of the House, the party holds 1 out of 235 seats (state of the parties, June 2005).

Local political parties in the Philippines
Politics of Sarangani
Regionalist parties
Regionalist parties in the Philippines